Arnay-sous-Vitteaux (literally Arnay under Vitteaux) is a commune in the Côte-d'Or department in the Bourgogne-Franche-Comté region of eastern France.

The inhabitants of the commune are known as Arnétois or Arnétoises

Geography
Arnay-sous-Vitteaux is located some 50 km north-west of Dijon and 35 km south-east of Montbard. Access to the commune is by the D905 road from Vitteaux in the south  passing through the east of the commune and continuing north to Venarey-les-Laumes. Access to the village is by the D1178 from Marigny-le-Cahouët in the north-west passing through the village then north-east to join the D905. There are forests in the west, centre, and east of the commune with the rest being farmland.

The Brenne river passes through the commune from south to north parallel to and west of the D905. The Ruisseau de Chassaigne rises in the south of the commune and flows north through the village to join the Brenne east of the village.

Neighbouring communes and villages

Administration

List of Successive Mayors

Demography
In 2017 the commune had 111 inhabitants.

Sites and monuments
The Fortified house of Arnay.
The Chapel of Saint Abdon.
The Parish Church of Saint Alban contains several items that are registered as historical objects:
A Stained glass window: Virgin and child with donors (15th century)
A Statue: Saint Catherine (16th century)
A Monumental Painting: a Bishop and a Consecrational Cross (16th century)
A Stained glass window (17th century)

Gallery of Historical Items

See also
Communes of the Côte-d'Or department

References

External links
Arnay-sous-Vitteaux on the National Geographic Institute website 
Arnay-sous-Vitteaux on Géoportail, National Geographic Institute (IGN) website 
Arnay-sous-Vitteaux on the 1750 Cassini Map

Communes of Côte-d'Or